Carl Michael Lesher (born 1951) is an American geologist. He is an authority on the geology and origin of nickel-copper-platinum group element deposits, especially those associated with komatiites, their physical volcanology and localization, the geochemistry and petrology of associated rocks, and controls on their composition.

Life, education, and career

Lesher was born in Indianapolis, Indiana, United States, but has been living and working in Canada beginning in 1975 and continuously since 1997. He holds BSc and MA degrees in geology from Indiana University, and a PhD degree in geology from the University of Western Australia. Between 1975 and 1979, he worked as an Exploration Geologist and Mineralogist for the Iron Ore Company of Canada; between 1982 and 1984, he was a Postdoctoral Research Fellow at the J. Tuzo Wilson Research Laboratories of the University of Toronto; and between 1984 and 1997, he was Professor of Economic Geology at the University of Alabama in Tuscaloosa. In 1997, he was appointed Professor of Economic Geology, NSERC Senior Industrial Research Chair in Mineral Dxploration, and Founding Director of the Mineral Exploration Research Centre at Laurentian University in Sudbury, Ontario. In 2010-2011 he served as Director of Mining Initiatives, designing and founding the School of Mines (now Goodman School of Mines). He has been a Visiting Fellow at the Max Planck Institute für Geochemie (1989 and 1991) and the Research School of Earth Sciences at the Australian National University (1990), an Honorary Professor at the Chengdu University of Technology (2000), and a Visiting Professor at Indiana University (2002-2003), and has given plenary, keynote, and invited lectures all over the world. In 2021 he was appointed Professor Emeritus at Laurentian University.

Between 1998 and 2002, Lesher was Leader of the International Union of Geological Sciences- and UNESCO-sponsored International Geological Correlation Program (now International Geoscience Programme) Project 427, Ore-Forming Processes in Dynamic Magmatic Systems. Between  2012  and 2018 he was Principal Investigator and Project Director of the $13M pan-Canadian "Integrated Multi-Parameter Footprints of Ore Systems" project, sponsored by the Natural Sciences and Engineering Research Council of Canada and the Canada Mining Innovation Council. He is currently a Co-Investigator on the $100M Metal Earth program, sponsored by the Canada First Research Excellence Fund and the Northern Ontario Heritage Fund.

Lesher has authored or co-authored over 500 scientific publications, and has served on the editorial boards of Mineralogical Abstracts (1987-1988), The Canadian Mineralogist (1989-1991), Reviews in Economic Geology (1993-1998), and Mineralium Deposita (2010–2016). In addition to his research, he has consulted for mining companies in Australia, Canada, Finland, and the USA.

Honours and awards
Lesher has been awarded the Duncan R. Derry Medal (2007) from the Mineral Deposits Division of the Geological Association of Canada, and co-awarded the Julian Boldy Award (2002) by the Geological Association of Canada, and the Wardell Armstrong Prize (2009) by the Institution of Mining and Metallurgy. He has served as a Society of Economic Geologists Thayer Lindsley Visiting Lecturer (1998-1999) and as a Canadian Institute of Mining and Metallurgy University Lecturer (1997-1998). He is an elected Fellow of the Society of Economic Geologists, the Geological Society of America, and the Geological Association of Canada.

Selected publications
2022, Wang Y, Lesher CM, Lightfoot PC, Pattison EF, Golightly JP, 2022, Genesis of Sublayer in the Sudbury Igneous Complex, Canada, Economic Geology, https://doi.org/10.5382/econgeo.4948
2019, Lesher CM, Up, down, or sideways: Emplacement of magmatic Ni-Cu ± PGE sulfide melts in Large Igneous Provinces, Canadian Journal of Earth Sciences (Special Issue on Large Igneous Provinces) v. 56: p.  756–773, http://doi.org/10.1139/cjes-2018-0177
2019, Lesher CM, Carson HJE, Houlé M, Genesis of chromite deposits by dynamic upgrading of Fe ± Ti oxide xenocrysts, Geology v. 47 (3): p.  207-210, https://doi.org/10.1130/G45448.1
2017, Lesher CM, Roles of residues/skarns, xenoliths, xenocrysts, xenomelts, and xenovolatiles in the genesis, transport, and localization of magmatic Fe-Ni-Cu-PGE sulfides and chromite, Ore Geology Reviews v. 90: p. 464-485, https://doi.org/10.1016/j.oregeorev.2017.08.008
2012, Burrows D, Lesher CM, Copper-rich magmatic Ni-Cu-PGE deposits, SEG Special Publication v. 16: p. 515-552, https://pubs.geoscienceworld.org/books/book/1385/
2011, Houlé M, Lesher CM, Komatiite-associated Ni-Cu-(PGE) mineralization in the Abitibi Greenstone Belt, Ontario. Reviews in Economic Geology v. 17, p. 89-121
2011, Layton-Matthews DM, Lesher CM, Liwanag J, Halden N, Burnham OM, Hulbert L, Peck DC, Keays RR, Mineralogy, geochemistry, and genesis of komatiite-associated Ni-Cu-(PGE) mineralization in the Thompson Nickel Belt, Manitoba. Reviews in Economic Geology v. 17, p. 123–143
2009, Lesher CM, Barnes SJ, Komatiite-Associated Ni-Cu-(PGE) Deposits, in C Li and EM Ripley (Editors), Magmatic Ni-Cu-PGE Deposits: Genetic Models and Exploration, Geological Publishing House of China, p. 27-101
2008, Arndt NT, Lesher CM, Barnes SJ, Komatiite, Cambridge University Press, Cambridge, 488 pp., 
2007, Lesher CM, Ni-Cu-(PGE) Deposits in the Raglan Area, Cape Smith Belt, New Québec, in Goodfellow, W.D. (Editor), Mineral Resources of Canada: A Synthesis of Major Deposit-types, District Metallogeny, the Evolution of Geological Provinces, and Exploration Methods, Geological Survey of Canada and Mineral Deposits Division of the Geological Association of Canada Special Publication, p. 351-386
2005, Arndt NT, Lesher CM, Czamanske GK, Mantle-derived magmas and magmatic Ni-Cu-(PGE) deposits, 100th Anniversary Volume, Society of Economic Geologists, p. 5-23
2002, Lesher CM, Keays RR, Komatiite-Associated Ni-Cu-(PGE) Deposits: Mineralogy, Geochemistry, and Genesis, in LJ Cabri (Editor), The Geology, Geochemistry, Mineralogy, and Mineral Beneficiation of the Platinum-Group Elements, Canadian Institute of Mining, Metallurgy and Petroleum, Special Volume 54, p. 579-617
2001, Lesher CM,  Burnham OM, Multicomponent elemental and isotopic mixing in Ni-Cu-(PGE) ores at Kambalda, Western Australia. Canadian Mineralogist, v. 39, p. 421-446
1996, Stowell HH, Lesher CM, Green NL, Sha P, Sinha, K, Metamorphism and gold mineralization in the Blue Ridge, southernmost Appalachians. Economic Geology, v. 91, p. 1115-1144
1989, Lesher CM, 1989, Komatiite-associated nickel sulfide deposits, Reviews in Economic Geology v. 4, p. 45-101
1986, Lesher CM, Goodwin AM, Campbell IH,  Gorton MP, Trace element geochemistry of ore-associated and barren felsic metavolcanic rocks in Superior Province, Canada. Canadian Journal of Earth Sciences, v. 23, p. 222-237

References
Personal Webpage
{https://scholar.google.ca/citations?user=NdnD06gAAAAJ&hl=en Google Scholar Profile]
LinkedIn Profile
Derry Citation in Gangue
Laurentian University re Derry Award
May 2013 NSERC Impact Story
May 2013 NSERC News Release
Dec 2011 NSERC InPartnership Newsletter

External links
Duncan Derry Medal Awardees
Thayer Lindsley Lecturers

Canadian geologists
Indiana University alumni
University of Western Australia alumni
Academic staff of Laurentian University
1951 births
Living people
Fellows of the Geological Society of America
Economic geologists
20th-century Canadian scientists
21st-century Canadian scientists
20th-century American geologists
21st-century American geologists
University of Toronto alumni
University of Alabama faculty
Scientists from Ontario
Scientists from Indiana